Kronig or Krönig may refer to:

People:
Alfred Kronig (born 1928), Swiss cross country skier who competed in the 1950s
August Karl Krönig (1822–1879), German chemist and physicist
Ralph Kronig (1904–1995), German-American physicist noted for the discovery of particle spin and his theory of x-ray absorption spectroscopy

Mathematics and Science:
Coster Kronig transition, special case of the Auger process in which the vacancy is filled by an electron from a higher subshell of the same shell
Kramers–Kronig relations, mathematical properties connecting real and imaginary parts of any complex function which is analytic in the upper half plane

See also
König (disambiguation)

German-language surnames